Friendly Fire (literally "justice attack") is a 2012 Hong Kong legal drama television series produced by TVB under executive producers Tommy Leung and Man Wai-hung and starring Michael Tse, Tavia Yeung, Sammy Leung and Sharon Chan.

Production
The series was confirmed to film by the producers on 10 February 2012. An internal costume fitting was held on 12 April 2012 at TVB City. Principal photography officially started on 29 April 2012. The blessing ceremony was held on 10 May 2012 at Tseung Kwan O TVB City Studio One Parking Lot at 3:00PM.

Plot
Barrister JJ Kam (Michael Tse) and Director of Public Prosecutions Chris Fong (Tavia Yeung) used to be cohabiting lovers, but ended up separating due to a failed marriage proposal. Fate has it when JJ makes a job transition to take a position of Prosecutor, resulting in the two working under the same roof once again. With their distinctly different approaches in handling cases, plus the interference of a new secretary (Grace Wong), the already severe crisis in their relationship has been pushed to the edge to an nonredeemable state. Though JJ is still perturbed by the refusal of his marriage proposal, Chris actually has something rarely known to the others.
On the other hand, an orphan Kam Po-tei (Sammy Leung), was adopted by JJ’s father Kam Po-cheung (Benz Hui), and JJ are as close as biological brothers. As a detective of the Criminal Investigation Department, Po-tei frequently cooperates with JJ. During an operation, he gets to know an undercover detective Ngai Mei-san (Sharon Chan). Though the pair are completely incompatible with each other, they do acquire the other’s strengths to offset their own deficiencies. Furthermore, Po-tei initiates to pursue Mei-san regardless of his own lot or the fact she has already a fiancé. As each of them is hesitating over their future, a murder case involving a wealthy businesswoman Pong Tit-sum (Alice Chan) makes them go through an arduous and fierce journey all together.

Cast

Main cast

Other cast

Viewership ratings
The following is a table that includes a list of the total ratings points based on television viewership.

External links
K-TVB.net Series Synopsis (English)
spcnet.tv Pictures, reviews, and cast list profiles.

References

TVB dramas
Hong Kong legal television series
Serial drama television series
2012 Hong Kong television series debuts
2013 Hong Kong television series endings
2010s Hong Kong television series